The 1994–95 Illinois State Redbirds men's basketball team represented Illinois State University during the 1994–95 NCAA Division I men's basketball season. The Redbirds, led by second year head coach Kevin Stallings, played their home games at Redbird Arena and were a member of the Missouri Valley Conference.

The Redbirds finished the regular season at season 18–11, 13–5 in conference play to finish in a tie for second place with Southern Illinois University. They were seeded second for the conference tournament. They won their quarterfinal game versus Southwest Missouri State University and lost their semifinal game versus Southern Illinois University.

Illinois State received an at-large bid to the National Invitation Tournament (NIT). The Redbirds beat Utah State on the road in overtime in the first round, but lost by three points at home to Washington State in the second round to end at 20–13.

Roster

Schedule

|-
!colspan=9 style=|Regular Season

|-
!colspan=9 style=|Missouri Valley Conference {MVC} tournament

|-
!colspan=9 style=|National Invitation {NIT} tournament

References

Illinois State Redbirds men's basketball seasons
Illinois State
Illinois State
Illinois State Men's Basketball
Illinois State Men's Basketball